The Uruguayan records in swimming are the fastest ever performances of swimmers from Uruguay, which are recognised and ratified by the Uruguayan Swimming Federation: Federación Uruguaya de Natación (FUN).
 
All records were set in finals unless noted otherwise.

Long course (50 m)

Men

Women

Mixed relay

Short Course (25 m)

Men

Women

References
General
 Uruguayan records 15 December 2022 updated
Specific

External links
 Federación Uruguaya de Natación

Uruguay
Records
Swimming
Swimming